The Velvet Hand is a 1918 American drama film directed by Douglas Gerrard and written by F. McGrew Willis. The film stars Fritzi Brunette, William Conklin, Gino Corrado, F. A. Turner, Wedgwood Nowell and Carmen Phillips. The film was released on September 30, 1918, by Bluebird Photoplays, Inc.

Plot

Cast         
Fritzi Brunette as Gianna Russelli
William Conklin as Count Paul Trovelli
Gino Corrado as Russino Russelli 
F. A. Turner as Russo Russelli
Wedgwood Nowell as Prince Visconte
Carmen Phillips as Countess Michetti
Nicholas Dunaew as Secretary

References

External links
 

1918 films
1910s English-language films
Silent American drama films
1918 drama films
Universal Pictures films
American silent feature films
American black-and-white films
1910s American films